Combretum celastroides is a species of flowering plant in the bushwillow genus Combretum, family Combretaceae. It is found in Zambia, Zimbabwe, Botswana, and Namibia, and is also known in English as Jesse-bush bushwillow, Trailing bushwillow, or Zambezi jessebush, and in local languages as Mugalusaka and Umlalanyathi.

References

celastroides
Flora of Africa
Flora of Botswana
Flora of Namibia
Flora of Zambia
Flora of Zimbabwe
Plants described in 1808